Alcohol in the United Kingdom is legal to buy, sell and consume. Consumption rates within the country are high among the average of OECD nations however average among European countries but consistently ranks highest on binge drinking culture. An estimated 29 million people in the United Kingdom drank alcohol in 2017.

History 
Evidence of historical consumption of alcohol in the United Kingdom stretches back to possibly 12,000 years ago of alcohol fermentation jugs being found.

By the 8th century the consumption of alcoholic beverage's had become a "staple part of the British diet among manual workers".

Roman history 
During the Roman Empire, British pub culture, in tabernae, began, combining the northern European tradition of" extremes of heavy episodic drinking" of "feast drinking", which remained untouched from Roman pressure and social drinking within bars.

18th to 19th century

Attempts at prohibition 

Although the sale or consumption of commercial alcohol has never been prohibited by law in the United Kingdom, historically, various groups in the UK have campaigned for the prohibition of alcohol; including the Society of Friends (Quakers), The Methodist Church and other non-conformists, as well as temperance movements such as Band of Hope, temperance Chartist movements of the nineteenth century and the United Kingdom Alliance who advocated for a legal ban of alcohol. An attempt was also made during the First World War which was due to consumption of alcohol by the army. Legislation passed which had a prohibitionist agenda was the Sale of Beer Act of 1854 which restricted Sunday opening hours however this was repealed following widespread rioting in conjunction, another attempt was made in 1859 with a prototype prohibition bill but this was overwhelmingly defeated in the House of Commons.

20th to 21st century 
In the 1930s, the book 'The Pub and the People' was produced by a group of observers who went to observe life in a normal British pub and to come back and report on the culture and activities in working class life.

In 2004, alcohol consumption peaked at an all time high of 11.6 litres which was around double then in 1954.

Consumption rates 

Consumption rates for alcohol in the United Kingdom are high along the general trend of OECD nations.

However the disparity between general consumers and people who consume alcohol more than the regular is stark, around 4.4% of drinkers in the entire UK drink around 1/3rd of all alcohol consumed in the country in 2018.

Consumption

Binge drinking 
Heavy binge drinking is well established in Britain and the country consistently ranks highest for binge drinking culture in health reports.

The percentage of people binge drinking varies slightly from constituent country to country, In England in 2019 this was 15%, Wales; 14% and Scotland 18%.

Cost 
Binge drinking costs the UK economy approximately £20 billion a year; 17 million working days are estimated to be lost due to hangovers and drink-related illness each year. The cost of binge drinking to employers is estimated to be £6.4 billion and the cost per year of alcohol harm is estimated to cost the National Health Service £2.7 billion. Urgent action has been recommended to understand the binge drinking culture and its aetiology and pathogenesis and urgent action has been called for to educate people with regard to the dangers of binge drinking.

Teetotal 
People who do not drink alcohol (teetotal) are a rising percentage of people in the UK, especially amongst younger generations, standing at 20% of the population. This percentage varies through the constituent countries of the UK, in England in 2019, this percentage is 20%, Scotland; 17%, Wales; 20% and Northern Ireland; 19%. In numerical terms, this equates to 10.4 million people.

Death and disorder rate 
Deaths due to alcohol consumption have historically risen since the 1990's, in 2020 this has peaked in a 20 year high for England and Wales.

Type of drinks 

The United Kingdom has historically been a beer consuming country however from the 1960's onwards wine has increased in prevalence of consumption. This increase in consumption has largely come from women, According to the Institute of Alcohol Studies, 7 out of 10 wine bottles bought in supermarkets are bought by women.

Beer 

Historically beer has been the choice of drink within Britain but since the 1960's and more prominently the 1980's, wine consumption has mostly taken up beer's previous market domination within the UK.

In 2018, beer consumption once again became the largest consumed type of alcohol within the UK with 8.5 billion pints sold in the year while wine had a total of 7.4 billion 175ml glasses worth sold and cider selling 1.2 billion pints.

Cider 

Cider is also a popular drink within the United Kingdom with the country being the biggest producer of cider's in Europe. The UK also is the world's biggest consumer of cider brands. In 2018 a total of 1.2 billion pints worth of cider was sold in the UK.

Wine 

Wine within the United Kingdom has become a more popular choice of consumption within recent decades.

Production of Wine with the United Kingdom compared with recent consumption is quite low but has increased since the 1990's steadfastly. In 2008 production of wine bottles was around 1.34 million which doubled to 3.17 million the following year in 2009. In 2018, a record number had been reached of 15.6m bottles being produced in England and Wales.

Wine had a total of 7.4 billion 175ml glasses worth sold in 2018.

Spirits 
Spirits have historically since the 19th century in the UK been roughly consumed at the same rate overtime.

In 2017, drinkers were roughly spending £1,500 on mostly premium spirits.

Popular brands 
Popular brands of alcohol in the United Kingdom include;

Price

Price 
The price of alcohol has gradually become more affordable overtime on a per capita basis. This price varies from location in the UK, in London the average price of a pint is £5.20 while across the UK as a whole it is £3.50.

Sales 
Alcohol sales fell in 2020 due to the closure of pubs during the COVID-19 pandemic.

The average spend on alcohol per person per week in 2020 was £7.43 across the entire UK, which was 10% higher then in 2017.

Law 

Alcohol licensing laws have changed over time and vary between constituent countries of the UK but generally remain consistent.

Societal impact 
Alcohol has had a societal impact on the UK culturally, economically and socially.

Economy 

The UK alcohol industry makes up around 2.5% of the country's total GDP to national income which equates to a contribution of £46 billion a year, in employment, the industry is responsible for 770,000 jobs which is 2.5% of all employment in the country.

See also 
List of countries by alcohol consumption per capita

References and notes

Notes

References 

Consumption
Health in the United Kingdom